Alexandros Kardaris (born 14 January 2001) is a Greek professional footballer who plays as a right-back for Super League 2 club Anagennisi Karditsa.

References

2001 births
Living people
Greek footballers
Super League Greece players
Super League Greece 2 players
Asteras Tripolis F.C. players
O.F. Ierapetra F.C. players
Anagennisi Karditsa F.C. players
Association football fullbacks
Footballers from Pyrgos, Elis